Washington Gold House, also known as "Mountain View" Farm, is a historic home located near Gerrardstown, Berkeley County, West Virginia. It was built in 1854 and is a two-story,"L"-shaped brick dwelling in the Greek Revival style.  The house is in two sections; the front section is five bays wide and the rear section four bays deep.  The front facade features a Victorian entrance porch added about 1890.  Also on the property is a carriage house (c. 1890) and small long cabin, known as the Rippey cabin (c. 1760) for the original owner.

It was listed on the National Register of Historic Places in 1984.

References

Houses on the National Register of Historic Places in West Virginia
Greek Revival houses in West Virginia
Houses completed in 1761
Houses in Berkeley County, West Virginia
National Register of Historic Places in Berkeley County, West Virginia